Leeds Rhinos will play in the 2012 Super League season, alongside Bradford Bulls, Castleford Tigers, Catalans Dragons, Huddersfield Giants, Hull FC, Hull K.R, London Broncos, Salford City Reds, St. Helens, Wakefield Trinity Wildcats, Warrington Wolves. Widnes Vikings, Wigan Warriors

Transfers

Ins
Richard Moore (Crusaders RL)
Luke Briscoe (Hull)
Darrell Griffin (Huddersfield Giants)
Shaun Lunt (Huddersfield Giants) (loan, signed mid season)

Outs
Ali Lauitiiti (Wakefield Trinity Wildcats)
Keith Senior (released)
Luke Burgess (South Sydney Rabbitohs)
Danny Buderus (Newcastle Knights)
Ben Cross (Wigan Warriors, 2011), (Widnes Vikings, 2012)
Kyle Amor (Wakefield Trinity Wildcats) (loan)
George Elliott (York City Knights)
Callum Casey, Michael Coady and Rory Kettlewell (all released)

Squad
Confirmed squad

Season review

Previous season
News related to this season
 16 June 2011 – Leeds Rhinos announce that props Luke Burgess (signed for South Sydney Rabbitohs) and Ben Cross (signed for Wigan Warriors 2011 and Widnes Vikings 2012) will leave the club.
 7 July 2011 – After 13 years at the club, Keith Senior announced that he would be joining Crusaders.
 27 July 2011 – Following the Super League licensing announcement, which saw Crusaders withdraw their licence, so Keith Senior was left without a club.
 10 August 2011 – Wakefield Trinity Wildcats announce the signing of Ali Lauitiiti ending an 8-year stay at the club.
12 August 2011 Leeds Rhinos announce the signing of prop Richard Moore from Crusaders on a 3-year contract.
22 September 2011 Leeds announce the signing of Hull F.C. youngster Luke Briscoe.
28 September 2011 Leeds announce that hookers Paul McShane and Liam Hood signed 4-year contracts in anticipation of Danny Buderus leaving.
30 September 2011 Leeds Rhinos reach the Super League Grand Final for the 4th time in 5 years, they take on St. Helens.
30 September 2011 – Danny Buderus reveals that the Grand Final will be his farewell from the club, announcing that he will be joining Newcastle Knights for a second stint, to end his career. Buderus made 220 appearances for the Knights before joining Leeds in 2009, he was man of the match in the game that got Leeds to the final vs Warrington Wolves

October
3 October 2011 – Leeds announce that Kyle Amor will join Wakefield Trinity Wildcats on a 3-year contract. However the Rhinos have the option of getting him back after a year.
8 October 2011 – Rhinos youngster George Elliott will join York City Knights in 2012, he made one first team appearance this season.
8 October 2011 – Leeds Rhinos are crowned Super League Champions beating St. Helens 32–16 in front of 69,107 people, Leeds scrum half Rob Burrow won the Harry Sunderland Trophy. Leeds are the first team to win from 5th place in the Super League history. Leeds will now face Manly Sea Eagles in the World Club Challenge.
10 October 2011 - 9 Rhinos were called up for England duty. Kevin Sinfield, Ryan Hall, Ben Jones Bishop, Ryan Bailey, Jamie Jones Buchanan, Carl Ablett and captaining England is prop Jamie Peacock. Zak Hardaker and Chris Clarkson have been called up for England Knights duty.
11 October 2011 - Danny McGuire was added to the England squad after St. Helens Jonny Lomax pulled out through injury.
13 October 2011 - Leeds Rhinos announce the signing of Huddersfield Giants prop Darrell Griffin on a 3-year contract.
17 October 2011 - Leeds Rhinos youngsters James Duckworth and new signing Luke Briscoe added to the England Academy squad alongside Stevie Ward and Jordan Baldwinson in the squad to face the Australian Institute of Sport (AIS) at Leigh Sports Village, Leigh on Sunday 4 December 2011.
18 October 2011 - Leeds Rhinos academy products Liam Hood, Stevie Ward and Brad Singleton have been called up to the Rhinos 25-man squad for 2012.
19 October 2011 - Leeds Rhinos players Ryan Hall, Kevin Sinfield, Jamie Peacock and player of the season Jamie Jones Buchanan are selected in the 17 to take on France in an international friendly, Peacock will captain the side.
21 October 2011 - England defeat France 32–18 with Ryan Hall scoring inside the first minute, and Kevin Sinfield contributing with the conversions.
24 October 2011 - It is announced that the World Club Challenge clash vs Manly Sea Eagles will be played at either Headingley Stadium or Elland Road despite suggestions that it may be played in Australia or Dubai
25 October 2011 - Leeds announce that youngsters Paul McShane, Zak Hardaker, Kallum Watkins, Ben Jones Bishop and Chris Clarkson will be in the 25-man squad and will be at the heart of the club for the 2012 season.
26 October 2011 - Ryan Hall, Kevin Sinfield, Jamie Peacock and Jamie Jones Buchanan are called up for England duty again in the first Four Nations game against Wales on Saturday 29 October.
29 October 2011 - England defeated Wales 42–4. Wigan Warriors full back Sam Tomkins scored 4 tries, and Leeds captain Kevin Sinfield kicked 5 out of 8 goals (10 points).

November 2011
3 November 2011 - Rhinos quartet Kevin Sinfield, Jamie Peacock (c), Ryan Hall and Jamie Jones Buchanan are included in the England team to take on Australia at Wembley on Saturday 5 November.
5 November 2011 - Ryan Hall scored two tries for England vs Australia despite losing 36–20.
10 November 2011 - Rhinos announced their 30-man squad for the 2012 season which involved no less than 13 changes to the squad numbers which are shown in the team section above, the likes of Zak Hardaker, Ben Jones Bishop, Kallum Watkins and Paul McShane were moved up into the first 13-man squad.
12 November 2011 - England defeat New Zealand 28-6 to reach the Four Nations Final, thanks to a try from Ryan Hall and Kevin Sinfield kicking 6 out of 6 goals, he also received the Man of the Match award. Jamie Peacock captained the side and Jamie Jones Buchanan was also part of the 17-man squad.
14 November 2011 - The Rhinos announced their new home shirt for the 2012 season, the kit is the traditional blue and amber, dark blue base with a yellow band across the middle.
 19 November 2011 - Rhinos stars Ryan Hall, Kevin Sinfield, Jamie Peacock (c) and Jamie Jones Buchanan featured for England against Australia in the Four Nations Final at Elland Road. Ryan Hall scored England's only try with Kevin Sinfield kicking the conversion and a penalty, however England lost 30–8.
22 November 2011 - The Heinz Big Soup World Club Challenge will take place at Headingley Stadium between the Rhinos and Manly Sea Eagles on Friday 17 February 2012.
25 November 2011 The Super League fixtures were announced, and the Rhinos will take on Hull K.R at Headingley Stadium. It was also announced that Leeds Rhinos will take on Bradford Bulls over the Manchester Magic weekend at Etihad Stadium on the weekend of 26/27 May. Leeds will finish the season against Huddersfield Giants at Galpharm Stadium.
28 November 2011 The 2013 Rugby League World Cup venues were revealed, it was announced that Headingley Stadium would be hosting a quarter-final and a group match, and Leeds as a city would be hosting two teams, providing facilities for both.
30 November 2011 - Leeds Rhinos announced a development in their partnership with Whitehaven, part of the latest agreement see the Rhinos take on Whitehaven in a friendly on 29 January 2012.

December 2011
 7 December 2011 - Rhinos head coach Brian McDermott was announced to be one of the top 5 personalities of the year in the Gillette Rugby League Yearbook 2011/2012 alongside Wigan Warriors Sam Tomkins, Man of Steel and Castleford Tigers Rangi Chase, Featherstone Rovers Head Coach Daryl Powell and recently retired Australia legend Darren Lockyer.
9 December 2011 - Leeds Rhinos player of the season Jamie Jones Buchanan confirmed that he would be a Rhinos for life by signing a new 3-year contract with the club.
19 December 2011 Rhinos announce their team for the game vs Wakefield Trinity on Boxing Day, the squad is as follows:
1. Lee Smith
2. Jimmy Watson
3. Kallum Watkins
4. Zak Hardaker
5. Jamel Chisholm
6. Stevie Ward
7. Rob Burrow
8. Darrell Griffin
9. Paul McShane
10. Ian Kirke
11. Jay Pitts
12. Weller Hauraki
13. Chris Clarkson
14. Liam Hood
15. Richard Moore
16. Brad Singleton
17. Luke Briscoe
23 December 2011 - Chris Clarkson signs a new five-year contract with the club.
26 December - Leeds Rhinos beat Wakefield Trinity Wildcats in the traditional Boxing Day clash at Headingley Stadium The final score was 26-10 thanks to tries for Chris Clarkson, Liam Hood, Kallum Watkins, Rob Burrow and Zak Hardaker, the Rhinos man of the match was announced as Weller Hauraki, new signings Darrell Griffin and Richard Moore made their debuts for the club.

January
 5 January - The Rhinos flew out to Cyprus for a pre season warm weather training camp.
 13 January 2012 - It was announced that the South Stand would be closed for the upcoming Rob Burrow testimonial match vs Featherstone Rovers on Friday 20 January due to planned maintenance work.
 15 January 2012 - A Leeds Rhinos U20's side lost to York City Knights 26–18 at the Huntington Stadium.
 17 January 2012 - Leeds Rhinos star winger Ryan Hall signed a new 5-year contract with the club to keep him at the club until the end of the 2016 season.
 19 January 2012 - The Rhinos announced a strong lineup for Rob Burrow's testimonial match vs Featherstone Rovers. The squad is a follows: 1 Brent Webb, 14 Lee Smith, 3 Kallum Watkins, 4 Zak Hardaker, 5 Ryan Hall, 6 Danny McGuire, 7 Rob Burrow, 8 Kylie Leuluai, 9 Paul McShane, 16 Ryan Bailey, 11 Jamie Jones Buchanan, 14 Brett Delaney, 12 Carl Ablett Subs: 19 Weller Hauraki, 24 Liam Hood, 20 Darrell Griffin, 21 Richard Moore, 18 Chris Clarkson
 20 January 2012 - The Rhinos beat Featherstone Rovers 66–0 in Rob Burrow's testimonial, tries came from Danny McGuire (4), Zak Hardaker (2), Rob Burrow, Ryan Hall, Paul McShane, Kallum Watkins and Liam Hood. Man of the match was the pocket rocket himself Rob Burrow.
 22 January 2012 - A young Leeds side mixed with a majority of U20's and some first team players beat Hunslet Hawks 22–20 at South Leeds Stadium, tries came from Ben Jones Bishop, Sean Casey, Daniel Smith and Stevie Ward.
 26 January 2012 - Kallum Watkins signed a new 5-year contract with the club.
 26 January 2012 - The Manchester Magic weekend schedule was announced, the Rhinos will play on Sunday 27 May vs Bradford Bulls at 4pm, all the matches will be played at Manchester City's Etihad Stadium. The full schedule is as follows:

 27 January 2012 The Rhinos announced a strong squad to play Whitehaven, the squad is as follows: 1 Jimmy Watson, 2 Ben Jones Bishop, 3 Jack Pring, 4 Jake Normington, 5 Jamel Chisholm, 6 Stevie Ward, 7 Ollie Olds, 8 Luke Ambler, 9 Sean Casey, 10 Daniel Smith, 11 Clayton Scott, 12 Jay Pitts, 13 Brad Singleton Subs: 14 Danny Bravo, 15 Matthew Syron, 16 Matthew Nicholson, 17 Kyle Quinlan, 18 Jay Leary
 29 January 2012 Leeds Rhinos lost 34-32 vs Whitehaven.

February
 1 February 2012 - The Rhinos announced their squad for the first game of the Super League season vs Hull K.R, the squad is as follows:
1 Brent Webb, 3 Kallum Watkins, 4 Zak Hardaker, 5 Ryan Hall, 6 Danny McGuire, 7 Rob Burrow, 8 Kylie Leuluai, 9 Paul McShane, 10 Jamie Peacock, 11 Jamie Jones Buchanan, 12 Carl Ablett, 13 Kevin Sinfield (c), 14 Lee Smith, 15 Brett Delaney, 16 Ryan Bailey, 18 Chris Clarkson, 19 Weller Hauraki, 20 Darrell Griffin, 21 Richard Moore
 1 February 2012 - Leeds also announced that the South Stand would be sponsored by Tetley's, with the North Stand sponsored by Leeds Building Society
 3 February 2012 - The Stobart Super League kicked off in style for the Rhinos who beat Hull K.R 34–16 at Headingley Stadium. The game marked Kevin Sinfield's 400th appearance for the club. Kallum Watkins scored a hat trick and won the man of the match award. Other tries came from Brett Delaney, Brent Webb and Danny McGuire, Kevin Sinfield kicked 5 out of 6 goals.
8 February 2012 - Brett Delaney signed a new 3-year contract with the club.
 9 February 2012 The Rhinos announced an unchanged 19-man squad to play Wigan Warriors:
1 Brent Webb, 3 Kallum Watkins, 4 Zak Hardaker, 5 Ryan Hall, 6 Danny McGuire, 7 Rob Burrow, 8 Kylie Leuluai, 9 Paul McShane, 10 Jamie Peacock, 11 Jamie Jones Buchanan, 12 Carl Ablett, 13 Kevin Sinfield (c), 14 Lee Smith, 15 Brett Delaney, 16 Ryan Bailey, 18 Chris Clarkson, 19 Weller Hauraki, 20 Darrell Griffin, 21 Richard Moore
 11 February 2012 - Leeds Rhinos lost 20-6 to Wigan Warriors in a rematch after the Wembley matchup in the Challenge Cup Final last year. However the game saw Darrell Griffin score his first Rhinos try.
 15 February 2012 - The Rhinos announced their squad for the Heinz Big Soup World Club Challenge, the squad is as follows: 1 Brent Webb, 2 Ben Jones Bishop, 3 Kallum Watkins, 4 Zak Hardaker, 5 Ryan Hall, 6 Danny McGuire, 7 Rob Burrow, 8 Kylie Leuluai, 9 Paul McShane, 10 Jamie Peacock, 11 Jamie Jones Buchanan, 12 Carl Ablett, 13 Kevin Sinfield (c), 15 Brett Delaney, 16 Ryan Bailey, 17 Ian Kirke, 18 Chris Clarkson, 19 Weller Hauraki, 20 Darrell Griffin
 17 February 2012 - Leeds Rhinos were crowned World Club Champions after a 26–12 victory against Manly Sea Eagles. Ryan Hall was given man of the match after scoring two tries, tries also came from Kallum Watkins, Ben Jones Bishop and Carl Ablett.
 26 February 2012 - Leeds Rhinos beat struggling Super League new boys Widnes Vikings 44–16 at the Stobart Stadium, tries came from Ben Jones Bishop (2), Rob Burrow (2), Ryan Hall (2), Zak Hardaker and Kallum Watkins, Kevin Sinfield kicked 6/8 goals.

March
 2 March 2012 - The Rhinos beat Castleford Tigers 36–14. Tries came from Ryan Hall (3) and Kallum Watkins. Danny McGuire scored his customary try against the Tigers and hooker Liam Hood scored a try on his debut.
 6 March 2012 - 11 Leeds Rhinos players were announced in the England Elite train on squad, they are as follows: Jamie Peacock, Kevin Sinfield, Ryan Hall, Danny McGuire, Rob Burrow, Zak Hardaker, Ben Jones Bishop, Carl Ablett, Jamie Jones Buchanan, Ryan Bailey and Kallum Watkins. Chris Clarkson was added to the England Knights squad.
9 March 2012 - Champions Leeds Rhinos beat league leaders Warrington Wolves 26–18 at Headingley Stadium. Tries came from Danny McGuire, Zak Hardaker, Kallum Watkins and Liam Hood. Man of the match was Rob Burrow.
16 March 2012 - Leeds Rhinos beat Salford City Reds 56–16 at Salford City Stadium. Tries came from Zak Hardaker (3), Brett Delaney, Kallum Watkins, Liam Hood, Kevin Sinfield, Carl Ablett, Danny McGuire, Rob Burrow. Kevin Sinfield also broke Lewis Jones's point record to become the all-time highest point scorer at the Rhinos.
23 March 2012 - Jamie Peacock MBE signed a new 2-year contract which will keep him at the club until the end of the 2014 season. He also confirmed that these will be his last 2 seasons before he retires.

April

May

June

July

August

September

October

Previous season results

Super League

Play-off results

Challenge Cup results

Key:
 W=Win D=Draw L=Loss
 H=Home A=Away N=Neutral
 P01 = Play Off 1 PO2 = Play Off 2 POSF = Play Off Semi Final GF = Grand Final
 CCR4/5/QF/SF/F = Challenge Cup Round 4/5/Quarter Final/Semi Final/Final
  = Bradford Bulls  = Castleford Tigers,  = Catalans Dragons,  = Crusaders,  = Harlequins,  Huddersfield Giants,  = Hull FC,  = Hull K.R,  = Salford City Reds,  = St. Helens,  = ,  = Warrington Wolves,  – Wigan Warriors

Games

Pre season

December

Heatshot Festive Challenge

January

York vs Leeds

Rob Burrow's testimonial

Lazenby Cup

Whitehaven vs Leeds

World Club Challenge

League/Challenge Cup

February

Round 1

Round 2

Round 3
Rearranged due to the World Club Challenge

Round 4

March

Round 5

Round 6

Round 7

Round 8

Round 9

April

Round 10

Round 11

Challenge Cup Round 4

Round 12

Challenge Cup Round 5

May

Round 13

Challenge Cup Quarter Final

Round 14

Round 15 Magic Weekend

June

Round 16

Round 17

Round 18

April

May

June

July

August

September

October

Result Round by Round

  = Bradford Bulls  = Castleford Tigers,  = Catalans Dragons,  Huddersfield Giants,  = Hull FC,  = Hull K.R,  London Broncos,  = Salford City Reds,  = St. Helens,  = ,  = Warrington Wolves,  – Wigan Warriors,  = Widnes Vikings

Team statistics

Player appearances

Player statistics
Appearances for competitive matches only

Super League

Challenge Cup

Overall
(includes Super League, Challenge Cup and World Club Challenge)

Leeds Super League top scorers

Top try scorers

Super League statistics

Table

Super League top try scorers

Top goal scorer

Top metres

Top carries

Top tackler

2013 season

Squad

Player movements

Ins

Outs
 Brent Webb (Released)
 Shaun Lunt (loan return, Huddersfield Giants)

References

Leeds Rhinos seasons
Leeds Rhinos season
Rugby